Alucita hemicyclus is a species of moth of the family Alucitidae. It is known from Tanzania.

References

Endemic fauna of Tanzania
Alucitidae
Insects of Tanzania
Moths of Africa
Moths described in 1917